This is a list of members of the 1st Legislative Assembly of Queensland from 1860 to 1863, as elected at the inaugural 1860 colonial elections held between 27 April 1860 to 11 May 1860 (due to problems of distance and communications, it was not possible to hold the elections on a single day).

See also
Premier:
 Robert Herbert (1859–1866)

Notes
 On 22 June 1860, William Nelson, member for West Moreton, was unseated by petition. Joseph Fleming won the resulting by-election on 9 July 1860.
 On 29 September 1860, Henry Buckley, member for East Moreton, resigned. Thomas Warry won the resulting by-election on 27 October 1860.
 On 17 October 1860, Henry Jordan, member for Town of Brisbane, resigned. Robert Cribb won the resulting by-election on 8 December 1860.
 On 21 December 1860, Alfred Broughton, member for West Moreton, resigned. Henry Challinor won the resulting by-election on 12 January 1861.
 On 3 April 1861, George Thorn (senior), member for West Moreton, resigned. Benjamin Cribb won the resulting by-election on 26 April 1861.
 On 16 May 1861, Henry Challinor, the member for West Moreton, resigned. He was re-elected at the resulting by-election on 31 May 1861.
 On 3 September 1861, Charles Fitzsimmons, the member for Port Curtis, resigned. Alfred Sandeman won the resulting by-election on 15 October 1861.
 On 14 January 1862, St. George Richard Gore, member for Warwick, resigned to contest a ministerial by-election after being made Secretary of Public Lands and Works. He was defeated by John Gore Jones at the resulting by-election on 4 February 1862.
 On 22 April 1862, Ratcliffe Pring, the member for Eastern Downs, resigned. John Donald McLean won the resulting by-election on 2 May 1862.
 On 26 July 1862, John Watts, the member for Drayton and Toowoomba, resigned. William Henry Groom won the resulting by-election on 11 August 1862.
 On 3 November 1862, Joseph Fleming, the member for West Moreton, resigned. Joshua Peter Bell won the resulting by-election on 15 December 1862.
 On 11 April 1863, Alfred Sandeman, the member for Port Curtis resigned due to complaints about his inactivity by his constituents. John Douglas won the resulting by-election on 12 May 1863.

References

 Waterson, Duncan Bruce: Biographical Register of the Queensland Parliament 1860–1929 (second edition), Sydney 2001.
 Alphabetical Register of Members (Queensland Parliament)

Members of Queensland parliaments by term
19th-century Australian politicians